Debbie Wilson may refer to:

 Debbie Wilson (90210), a character on the TV series 90210
 Debbie Wilson (cricketer) (born 1961), former Australian cricket player
 Debbie Wilson (Emmerdale), a fictional character on the ITV soap opera Emmerdale
 Deborah Wilson (born 1955), former American diver
 Debbie Wilson (1960-2011) aka Debbie Juvenile, a prominent member of early UK punk fan faction the Bromley Contingent, later a film set designer

See also
 Debra Wilson (born 1962), American actress, comedienne and television presenter